NBC Presents is a live [American anthology series produced by the National Broadcasting Company (NBC). A total of thirty-six episodes aired on NBC from January 3, 1949 to October 10, 1949.

Guest stars included Cloris Leachman, John Forsythe, Tom Ewell, Natalie Schafer, and Mary Wickes.

External links

NBC Presents at CVTA with list of episodes

1940s American anthology television series
1949 American television series debuts
1949 American television series endings
NBC original programming
American live television series